Sendarapatti, also known as Senthalai, is a panchayat town in Salem district in the Indian state of Tamil Nadu.

Sentharapatti is a Town Panchayat city in district of Salem, Tamil Nadu. The Sentharapatti city is divided into 15 wards for which elections are held every 5 years. The Sentharapatti Town Panchayat has population of 14,308 of which 7,067 are males while 7,241 are females as per report released by Census India 2011. Population of Children with age of 0-6 is 1365 which is 9.54% of total population of Sentharapatti (TP). In Sentharapatti Town Panchayat, Female Sex Ratio is of 1025 against state average of 996. Moreover, Child Sex Ratio in Sentharapatti is around 970 compared to Tamil Nadu state average of 943. Literacy rate of Sentharapatti city is 71.30% lower than state average of 80.09%. In Sentharapatti, Male literacy is around 79.06% while female literacy rate is 63.78%.  Sentharapatti Town Panchayat has total administration over 3,894 houses to which it supplies basic amenities like water and sewerage. It is also authorize to build roads within Town Panchayat limits and impose taxes on properties coming under its jurisdiction.

Reference:

http://www.censusindia.gov.in/2011census/dchb/3307_PART_B_DCHB_SALEM.pdf

References

Cities and towns in Salem district